Mystify: A Musical Journey with Michael Hutchence is an album by Australian recording artist Michael Hutchence. The album was released by Petrol Records and Universal Music Group on 5 July 2019, on CD, cassette, vinyl and digital formats. It features several INXS songs and unreleased recordings including several tracks with dialog. The album was released as a complementary recording to the 2019 documentary film, Mystify: Michael Hutchence.

Singles
On 24 May 2019, a cover of Eric Burdon & War's "Spill the Wine" was released as the album's lead single. The song was the fourth most added song to Australian radio in the week following its release.
 
On 27 June 2019, a new version of "Please (You Got That ...)" credited to INXS and Ray Charles was released as the album's second single. The track was originally recorded in Charles' studio in Los Angeles and released as a single in December 1993 from the band's ninth studio album Full Moon, Dirty Hearts. The new version includes in-studio banter between Hutchence and Charles.

Track listing
All tracks performed by INXS, except where noted. All tracks written by Andrew Farriss and Michael Hutchence, except where noted.

Charts

Release history

References

INXS compilation albums
2019 soundtrack albums
Soundtracks by Australian artists